The Junior Tour of Wales is an annual cycle race for junior male riders, held around Brynmawr, Blaenau Gwent, Wales. First held in 1981, the race is the final round of the British Cycling Junior Road Series – and as such attracts the best junior racing cyclists from across the UK, as well as elite international junior teams from across Europe and beyond. From 1981 until 1993 the race consisted of three stages held over two days. In 1993 it was expanded to three days and held on the August Bank Holiday for the first time. In 2017 it switched to a four-day format. In recent years the race's final stage has finished on the Tumble: this climb often decides the winner of the race.

Steve Jones and Eddie Smart were regular helpers at the Junior Tour of Wales. Following their death in a car accident, organiser John Richards introduced a shield to be awarded in their honour for the best Welsh rider.

In 2009, Jeff Banks became patron of the Junior Tour of Wales, to be succeeded in 2012 by Geraint Thomas.
The headquarters moved 2014 from Nantyglo Leisure Centre to Brynmawr Foundation School following the closure of the former.

Results

General classification

Points classification

King of the Mountains

Team classification

References

External links

2009 Race Programme, Junior Tour of Wales

Cycle races in Wales
Recurring sporting events established in 1981
Men's road bicycle races
1981 establishments in Wales